Đorđe Jovanović may refer to:

Đorđe Jovanović (sculptor) (1861–1963), Serbian sculptor
Đorđe Jovanović House, Đorđe Jovanović (sculptor) house
Đorđe Jovanović (writer) (1909–1943), Serbian Surrealist writer
Đorđe Jovanović (basketball) (born 1980), Serbian basketballer
Đorđe Jovanović (footballer) (born 1999), Serbian footballer